Clearfield–Lawrence Airport  is a public use airport located two nautical miles (2.3 mi, 3.7 km) northeast of the central business district of Clearfield, a borough in Clearfield County, Pennsylvania, United States. It is owned by the Clearfield–Lawrence Airport Authority.

The area offers fishing, hunting, camping, boating, and PennState Athletics. The airport is open from 8:00am–5:00pm daily and is closed Christmas Day. The airport is located at 801 Airport Rd.  above sea level. The airport has one runway measuring 4,500 x 75 ft and the asphalt is listed in excellent condition. The terminal has a pilot's lounge with a weather computer, a conference room, and a coffee shop. Car rental is provided by Enterprise Rent-a-car.

Although most U.S. airports use the same three-letter location identifier for the FAA and IATA, this airport is assigned FIG by the FAA but has no designation from the IATA (which assigned FIG to Fria Airport in Guinea).

Facilities and aircraft 
It has one runway designated 12/30 with an asphalt surface measuring 4,499 by 75 feet (1,371 x 23 m).

For the 12-month period ending June 3, 2011, the airport had 6,515 aircraft operations, an average of 17 per day: 99.8% general aviation and 0.2% military. At that time there were 14 aircraft based at this airport: 93% single-engine and 7% helicopter.

References

External links 
 Clearfield – Lawrence Township Airport
 Aerial photo as of 8 April 1993 from USGS The National Map
 

Airports in Pennsylvania
County airports in Pennsylvania
Transportation buildings and structures in Clearfield County, Pennsylvania